John Ackroyd (born 1868) was an English  footballer who played as a forward in the Football League for Grimsby Town and Rotherham Town. In 1891−92 in a match for Grimsby against Lincoln City he scored four goals in a 6−1 victory. He also played for Heanor Town.

References

English footballers
Heanor Town F.C. players
Grimsby Town F.C. players
Rotherham Town F.C. (1878) players
English Football League players
1868 births
Year of death missing
Association football forwards